Evin may refer to:

Evin, a neighbourhood in north Tehran, Iran
Evin Prison, a prison in north Tehran
Evin (name)
Evin, East Azerbaijan, a village in Iran
Évin-Malmaison, a commune in Pas-de-Calais, France
Eivind or Evin, a Norse name

See also
Loi Evin, a 1991 French alcohol and tobacco policy law, named after Claude Évin
Evins, a surname
Evan
Even (disambiguation)
Evon (given name)
Yevin